is a terminal on the Hakone Ropeway in the town of Hakone, Kanagawa, Japan.

Lines
Tōgendai Station is served by the Hakone Ropeway.

Layout
The boarding area for the Hakone Ropeway is on the second floor, with access by stairs or escalator, as the station is built barrier free for use by handicapped passengers.

History
Tōgendai Station opened on September 7, 1960 with the opening of the Hakone Ropeway Line.

Other transportation

Hakone Sightseeing Cruise (Named "Tōgendai-ko")
 for Hakone-machi Port , Moto-hakone Port 
Hakone Tozan Bus
Bus stop 1
 "T" Line for Hakone Yumoto Station and Odawara Station, via Sengoku-Kogen (Pampas grass viewing spot), Senkyoro mae (transfer for Pola Museum of Art, Hakone Art Museum (Kōen-Kami Station), Gora Park, Gora Station, Hakone Open-Air Museum, Kowaki-en, Yunessun, and Ten-yu), Kawamukai (The Little Prince and Saint-Exupéry Museum), Sengoku Annaijo (Hakone Botanical Garden of Wetlands, Lalique Museum),  Hakone Venetian Glass Museum, and Miyanoshita (transfer for Hakone Tozan Railway for Gora Station, and Bus for Moto-Hakone direction)
Odakyu Hakone Highway Bus
Bus stop 2
 "W" Line for Shinjuku Station (in Tokyo), via Otome Toge (Mount Fuji viewing spot), JR Gotemba Station (transfer for Gotemba Premium Outlets, Mount Fuji and Fuji Five Lakes, including Lake Kawaguchi and Lake Yamanaka), Tōmei-Gotemba (transfer for JR Tōmei Expressway Bus for JR Shizuoka Station and JR Nagoya Station)
 "V" Line for Haneda Airport via JR Yokohama Station (joint operation with Keikyu Bus)
Bus stop 3
 "W" Line for Hakone-En, Odakyu Hotel de Yama (Next to Hakone Shrine) via Kojiri

References

External links
Hakone Ropeway
Hakone Sightseeing Cruise
Hakone Tozan Bus (Togendai Bus Stop)
Odakyu Hakone Highway Bus (Bus Stop named "Hakone-Tōgendai")
Togendai Station Map (Hakone Navi)

Railway stations in Japan opened in 1960
Railway stations in Kanagawa Prefecture
Buildings and structures in Hakone, Kanagawa